Fox Mountain is a mountain located in the Modoc-Lassen Plateau of southwest Modoc County, California, which stands at 1,944 m (6,378 ft). It is around 11.1 km (6.9 mi) northwest of Adin, California.

Slightly northwest of the mountain, there is an old fire lookout tower accessible via dirt road.

References 

Mountains of Northern California
Mountains of Modoc County, California